Iladalen Church is a church center, located in Oslo, Norway. The church was consecrated on May 22, 1941 (during World War II) by Bishop Eivind Berggrav as Iladalen småkirke ("Iladalen Chapel"). The church was then nicknamed the "Velsignelsens kirke" ("Church of Blessing") by the bishop.

The church has facades of a tiled yellow brick, low pavement, roofed with red tiles, and the church tower is to the right side of the main entrance. The altarpiece  is designed by Per Vigeland, and is carved by Wilhelm R. Sjøwall. Per Vigeland has also done the wall fresco and the stained glass behind the church organ. Chandeliers and lamps are designed by the architect. The church organ is from 1971 and has 11 voices. The two church bells are cast by Olsen Nauen Bell Foundry.

The church is listed by the Norwegian Directorate for Cultural Heritage and protected by law.

References

External links
 Official website

Lutheran churches in Oslo
Churches completed in 1941
1941 establishments in Norway
20th-century Church of Norway church buildings